Villalago is a comune and town in the province of L'Aquila in the Abruzzo region of Italy.

References

See also
Rocca di Villalago
Hermitage of San Domenico